The Ushbas is a river in southern Kazakhstan.
 
The river flows across Sarysu district of the Zhambyl Region and Sozak District of the Turkistan Region. It has its mouth near Kumkent village.

Course
The Ushbas river has its origin in the northern slopes of the Karatau Range. It heads roughly northwestwards down a deep mountain valley with steep sides. In its final stretch it bends and flows roughly northwards, parallel to the Burkittі (Бүркітті), a left tributary of the Shabakty river, to the east. Finally it ends up in the southeastern shore of Kyzylkol lake.

The Ushbas is fed mainly by rain and underground water. In the summer, when the riverbed dries, the river doesn't reach Kyzylkol.

See also
List of rivers of Kazakhstan

References

External links
Kyzylkol Lake - BirdLife Data Zone 

Rivers of Kazakhstan
Turkistan Region
Jambyl Region
Endorheic basins of Asia
kk:Үшбас (өзен)